Neil Patrick Brady (born April 12, 1968) is a Canadian former professional ice hockey player. He is best known for scoring the first goal in the history of the contemporary Ottawa Senators franchise on October 8, 1992.

Playing career
Brady enjoyed an exemplary junior hockey career in the WHL with the Medicine Hat Tigers. After scoring 81 points in 72 games and registering over 100 penalty minutes in 1985–86, Brady was chosen third overall by the New Jersey Devils in the 1986 NHL Entry Draft. He was returned to junior, then turned pro with the AHL's Utica Devils in 1988–89. He made his NHL debut on October 5, 1989.

After just 29 games in 3 seasons in which Brady struggled with his confidence, the Devils organization gave up on him, and he was traded to the expansion Ottawa Senators for future considerations on September 3, 1992. Brady found early success in Ottawa, scoring the first goal for the modern-day Ottawa Senators franchise in both the pre-season, against the Hartford Whalers and the regular season against Montreal goaltender Patrick Roy. He went on to score 7 goals and 17 assists for 24 points during the 1992–93 season. Though these numbers were the best of his NHL career, they were nowhere near the standards he set at the junior level.

Brady fell out of favour with the Senators organization, and was signed as a free agent by the Dallas Stars in December, 1993, though he was chiefly a farmhand for his new team. In total, Brady played in 89 NHL games, scoring 9 goals and 22 assists for 31 points and 95 penalty minutes. Brady spent the remainder of his career in the now-defunct International Hockey League. He retired in 2001 after the league folded.

Personal
 Brady currently lives and works in Calgary, Alberta.

Career statistics

References

External links 

1968 births
Living people
Anglophone Quebec people
Canadian ice hockey centres
Chicago Wolves (IHL) players
Dallas Stars players
Houston Aeros (1994–2013) players
Ice hockey people from Montreal
Kalamazoo Wings (1974–2000) players
Manitoba Moose (IHL) players
Medicine Hat Tigers players
National Hockey League first-round draft picks
New Haven Senators players
New Jersey Devils draft picks
New Jersey Devils players
Ottawa Senators players
Utah Grizzlies (IHL) players
Utica Devils players
Canadian expatriate ice hockey players in the United States